Sir Chetput Pattabhiraman Ramaswami Iyer  (12 November 1879 – 26 September 1966), popularly known as Sir C. P., was an Indian lawyer, administrator and politician who served as the Advocate-General of Madras Presidency from 1920 to 1923, Law member of the Executive council of the Governor of Madras from 1923 to 1928, Law member of the Executive Council of the Viceroy of India from 1931 to 1936 and the Diwan of Travancore from 1936 to 1947. Ramaswami Iyer was born in 1879 in Madras city and studied at Wesley College High School and Presidency College, Madras before qualifying as a lawyer from the Madras Law College. He practised as a lawyer in Madras and succeeded S. Srinivasa Iyengar as the Advocate-General of the Madras Presidency. He subsequently served as the Law member of the Governor of Madras and of the Viceroy of India before being appointed Diwan of Travancore in 1936.

Ramaswami Iyer served as Diwan from 1936 to 1947; during his tenure, many social and administrative reforms were made. However, at the same time, he is also remembered for the ruthless suppression of the communist-organised Punnapra-Vayalar revolt, and his controversial stand in favour of an independent Travancore. He resigned in 1947 following a failed assassination attempt. He served as a leader of the Indian National Congress in his early days. He was made a Knight Commander of the Indian Empire in 1926 and a Knight Commander of the Star of India in 1941. He returned these titles when India attained independence in 1947. He was also a member of the 1926 and 1927 delegations to the League of Nations. In his later life he served in numerous international organisations and on the board of several Indian universities. Ramaswami Iyer died in 1966 at the age of 86 while on a visit to the United Kingdom.

Ancestry and origins 
C.P. Ramaswami Iyer belonged to the Vadadesa Vadama  whose seat was the town of Chetput in the North Arcot of Tamil Nadu. The family traces their lineage to Dikshit Brahmins who, they believed, were Deshastha Brahmins who migrated from Maharashtra and Madhya Pradesh to the town of Chittoor in Andhra Pradesh from where they migrated to the northern part of Tamil Nadu in the 16th century AD. 

As a reward for their piety and scholarship, the migrants were granted the villages of Chetput, Adayapalayam, and Morakkaniyur by a local chieftain. Ramaswami Iyer's family originated from the group which inherited the village of Chetput. 

C.P. was also related to Achan Dikshitar, brother of the famous Advaitist savant Appayya Dikshitar. C.P.'s grandfather, Chetput Ramaswami Iyer served the British East India Company as Tehsildar of Kumbakonam. His family was deeply attached to the Sringeri mutt.

Early life and education 
Chetpet Pattabhiraman Ramaswami Iyer was born on Deepavali day (13 November) 1879, to C.R. Pattabhirama Iyer (1857–1903), a prominent judge, and his wife, Seethalakshmi Ammal (also called Rangammal) in the town of Wandiwash, North Arcot. C.P. had his schooling at the Wesley College High School in Madras. He had an extremely strict upbringing as a result of a prediction that the child would not pass a single exam in his life. On completion of his schooling, C.P. enrolled at the Presidency College, Madras. 

In college, C.P. won prizes in English, Sanskrit and Mathematics and the Elphinstone Prize for his paper on the Nebular theory. C.P. passed his degree with a gold medal and graduated with distinction from the Madras Law College.

C.P. had always desired to become an English professor. However, his father, Pattabhirama Iyer wished that his son become a lawyer and accordingly, C.P. chose a career in law. He spent his college vacations in the Mysore kingdom with the Diwan, Sir K. Seshadri Iyer whom he reportedly always claimed as his inspiration.

As a lawyer 
In 1903, C.P. joined V. Krishnaswamy Iyer as an apprentice. Just before the death of Pattabhirama Iyer the same year, he arranged for C.P.'s admission as a junior to Sir V. Bhashyam Aiyangar but the latter was not able to accommodate him. As a result, C.P. practised on his own and made a reputation as a lawyer. He fought and won over 300 cases and was offered a judgeship of the Madras High Court which he, however, turned down. Forty-two minutes, my Lord, he once announced to a judge who asked him how much time he would need to finish a case.
 
In 1920, he was appointed Advocate-General of Madras by the then Governor, Lord Willingdon. During his tenure as a lawyer, C.P. handled a number of prominent cases as the Ashe murder trial and the Besant Narayaniah case.

Indian Independence Movement 
In his early days, C.P. was an admirer of Gopal Krishna Gokhale and desired to join the Servants of India society in Poona. In 1912, he fought on behalf of Jiddu Narayaniah against Annie Besant for the custody of his sons J. Krishnamurti and Nityananda in the famous Besant Narayaniah trial and won. Besant, however, later got the verdict annulled by appealing to the Privy Council in England. C.P. developed an admiration for Annie Besant and collaborated with her in organising the Home Rule League and served as its vice-president. In 1917, he became the Secretary of the Indian National Congress. He edited Besant's newspaper, New India, during her incarceration. at the same time, campaigning vigorously for her release. C.P. later distanced himself from the Indian Independence after disagreeing with Mahatma Gandhi over the Swadeshi and Non-Cooperation movements.

As a member of the Executive Council of the Governor of Madras 
In 1920, C.P. was nominated as the Advocate-General of Madras Presidency. He was responsible for the introduction of the City Municipalities Act and the Madras Local Boards Act. In 1923, he was nominated to the executive council of the Governor of Madras and was charged with the portfolios of law and order, police, Public Works Department, irrigation, ports and electricity.

As a member of the executive council, C. P. laid the foundation of the Pykara Dam which was constructed between 1929 and 1932 at a cost of Rs. 67.5 million. He also started the construction of Mettur Dam over the Cauvery river. While the Pykara Hydro-electric project triggered the rapid industrialization of Coimbatore, the Mettur project was used to irrigate vast areas of Tanjore and Trichy districts. As the member in charge of ports, C.P. was also responsible for the improvement of Cochin, Visakhapatnam and Tuticorin ports.

As law member, C.P. was instrumental in passing the Devadasi Abolition Bill proposed by Muthulakshmi Reddy. However, owing to strong protests from devadasis across Madras Presidency, C.P. suggested that the bill be introduced only as a private bill and not a government measure.

Between 1926 and 1927, he was the Indian Delegate at the League of Nations in Geneva. By 1931, he was a Law Member of the Government of India and, in 1932, attended the Third Round Table Conference at London. 

In 1933, he was the sole Indian delegate to the World Economic Conference and the next year he drafted a constitution for the state of Kashmir.

Diwan of Travancore 

In 1931, when Chithira Thirunal was barred from succeeding his deceased uncle as the Maharaja of Travancore, C.P. spoke on his behalf to the Viceroy of India. The Viceroy agreed to crown Chithira Thirunal but only on the condition that C.P. should function as adviser to the young monarch. C.P. agreed and served as Legal and Constitutional adviser to the prince from 1931 to 1936. In 1936, Maharajah Chithira Thirunal personally requested C.P. to be the Diwan of Travancore. C.P. accepted the offer and served as Diwan for a period of ten years.

Temple Entry Proclamation 

On 12 November 1936, Maharajah Chithira Thirunal issued the revolutionary Temple Entry Proclamation which gave Hindus of all castes and classes, including Dalits or untouchables, the right to enter Hindu temples in the state. This was bitterly opposed by conservative, yet influential upper-caste Hindus who posed a grave-threat to the life of the Diwan. This proclamation earned for the Maharajah and his Diwan the praise of Mahatma Gandhi and other reformers.

Economic and industrial reforms 

During C.P.'s tenure as Diwan, Travancore made rapid strides in industrial development. The Indian Aluminium Company was invited to set up a factory in the town of Aluva. The first fertiliser plant in India, the Fertilizers and Chemicals of Travancore Ltd. (FACT) was established by C. P. to manufacture ammonium sulphate. This was established with American collaboration in open defiance to the hostility of the Viceroy of India. C.P. also established a plant to manufacture cement and another to manufacture titanium dioxide. The Travancore plywood factory at Punalur The Travancore Rayons Limited was established in 1946 with a plant at Perumbavoor. The first plant to manufacture aluminium cables was opened at Kundara. 

By the time, C.P. stepped down as Diwan in 1947, the revenues of the state had increased fourfold from the time he had assumed charge.

Irrigation works 
C.P. wished to establish a hydroelectric power project on the Periyar river. However, his efforts were opposed by the Government of Madras. C.P. argued as a lawyer on behalf of Travancore and won. As a result, the Pallivasal hydro-electric power project was established on the Periyar river. He initiated  the Pechipara Hydro-electric Scheme (later, the Kodayar Hydroelectric Power Project in Kanyakumari District), the Periyar Game Sanctuary, and other irrigation projects.

Other reforms 

C.P. carried out a great deal of pioneering work for the Vivekananda Rock at Cape Comorin and built guest-houses at Kanyakumari. He renovated the Padmanabhapuram Palace of Marthanda Varma's days (in present-day Kanyakumari District) and expanded the Trivandrum Art Gallery. 

In 1937, C.P. started the University of Travancore with the Maharajah as Chancellor and himself as Vice Chancellor. In 1939, he was awarded an honorary L.L.D. Degree by the University of Travancore In 1940 under his Dewanship Travancore became the first state to nationalise road transport in India. 

The first cement highway in India was constructed between the capital Trivandrum and Kanniyakumari covering a distance of 88 kilometres. The same year capital punishment was abolished and adult franchise introduced. He was also the first to appoint a lady as District Judge (Mrs. Anna Chandy later became the first Indian woman High Court Judge). Iyer introduced for the first time the midday meal scheme to prompt poor children to attend school.

In 1941, the British conferred on him the title of Knight Commander of the Star of India (KCSI). When Indian Independence came into view Travancore and other Princely States were given two options of either staying independent or merging with the dominions of India or Pakistan.

Punnapra-Vayalar revolt 

A mass uprising broke out in the Alleppey region in October 1946. On 24 October Travancore police killed near about 200 people in Punnapra and the government ordered martial law in Alleppey and Cherthala. CP's police and army moved to Alleppey and on 27 October, Vayalar witnessed another mass uprising and 150 people were killed on the spot. On the same day, 130 people were killed in different locations of Alleppey in police shoot-outs. According to Prof. A Shreedhara Menon's Kerala History, about 1,000 people died in the Punnapra Vayalar Agitation. Even though the agitation was a short-lived failure, it resulted in better administration of Travancore.

Declaration of independence 
When, on 3 June 1947, the United Kingdom accepted demands for a partition and announced its intention to quit India within a short period, the Maharaja of Travancore desired to declare himself independent. Supported by the Diwan, C.P., Chithira Thirunal issued a declaration of independence on 18 June 1947. As Travancore's declaration of independence was unacceptable to India, negotiations were started with the Diwan by the Government of India. Family sources indicate that C.P. himself was not in favour of independence but only greater autonomy, and that a favourable agreement had been reached between C.P. and the Indian representatives by 23 July 1947 but accession to the Indian Union could not be carried out only because it was pending approval by the Raja. 

On the other hand, noted historian Ramachandra Guha has written about how C.P., egged on by Mohammed Ali Jinnah, had established secret ties with senior Ministers of the British Government, who encouraged him in the hope that he would give them privileged access to monazite, a material Travancore was rich in and which could give the British a lead in the nuclear arms race. 

Nevertheless, an assassination attempt was made on C.P. on 25 July 1947 during a concert commemorating the anniversary of Swati Thirunal. C.P. survived with multiple stab wounds and hastened the accession of Travancore state to the Indian Union soon after his recovery.

Later years 
After he resigned his Dewanship of Travancore, C. P. left for London. In the same year, he visited Brazil on the invitation of the Government of Brazil and Argentina, Peru and Mexico as a tourist. He also visited the United States, where he gave talks at the University of California, Berkeley, and had discussions with important bank executives, journalists and US President Harry S. Truman. 

In 1949–50, he visited the United States again as a visiting professor of the American Academy of Asian Studies at California. In 1952, he toured Australia and New Zealand as a guest of the respective governments and visited the United States again in 1953 on a lecture tour. 

From 1 July 1954 to 2 July 1956, he served as the Vice Chancellor of Banaras Hindu University. From 26 January 1955, C.P. also served as a Vice Chancellor of Annamalai University, thereby becoming the first Indian to function as Vice Chancellor of two universities at the same time. 

In 1953, C.P. was appointed member of the Press Commission of India. Two years later, C.P. toured China as the leader of an Indian universities delegation. C.P. served as a member of the University Grants Commission (1955), the Punjab Commission (1961), the National Integration Committee on Regionalism, the Chairman of the Hindu Religious Endowments Commission from 1960 to 1962, and President of the Inter-University board of India and Ceylon (1965).

Death 
In September 1966, C.P. left for England to conduct research on a planned book titled "A History of My Times" at the India Office library. At about 11:30 am, on 26 September 1966, he was in the National Liberal Club (where he had been a member for over 50 years), when he suddenly slumped on his armchair while speaking to a reporter and died instantly. The following day, The Times carried the news of his death:

Condolences were also offered by C. Rajagopalachari,
Zakir Hussain (then-President of India), The Hindu, The Times of India, Prime Minister of India Indira Gandhi, and K. Kamaraj.

Legacy 
C.P. was acknowledged for his talent as a lawyer, administrator and visionary. Edwin Samuel Montagu, who served as the Secretary of State for India from 1917 to 1922, described him as "one of the cleverest men in India". He is credited with having transformed Kanyakumari district into the rice-bowl of Travancore and is acclaimed for being the first person to envisage the industrialisation of Madras Presidency. He is also regarded as an egalitarian and the first caste Hindu lawyer to admit a Dalit, N. Sivaraj as his junior. 

Under his leadership, Travancore became the first princely state to abolish capital punishment, first to introduce free and compulsory education and the first princely state to be connected to the rest of India by air. M. G. Ramachandran, former Chief Minister of Tamil Nadu recollected at C.P.'s birth centenary celebrations in 1979 that C.P. was the first to introduce the midday meal scheme in the form of the Vanchi Poor Fund in Travancore. C. N. Annadurai remarked at a speech in 1967 that C. P. was the first person in India to suggest a plan for interlinking the nation's rivers. 

However, his greatest achievement is believed to be the Temple Entry Proclamation which for the first time, permitted Dalits to enter Hindu temples which he introduced despite a severe threat to his life.

C.P. was known for his philanthropic activities and the institutions he helped establish. After his death, The C. P. Ramaswami Aiyar Foundation was established in his memory in order to promote traditional arts and crafts. 

While serving as a law member of the executive council of the Governor of Madras, Ramaswami Iyer's agenda for social reform and opening the doors of Hindu temples for Dalits and low-caste Hindus were praised by C. Natesa Mudaliar, one of the founders of the South Indian Liberation Federation. C. P. was a patron of arts and music and was member of experts committee consisting of some of the leading musicians and scholars to advise the Madras Music Academy.

C. P. was a friend of the English writer Somerset Maugham who had a prolonged discussion with while on a visit to Trivandrum. Later, Maugham supplied a eulogy for the book, C.P. by his Contemporaries:

Indian civil servant C. S. Venkatachar wrote that the Kashmir issue might have been resolved in favour of India had Jawaharlal Nehru chosen C. P. instead of Gopalaswami Ayyangar to present India's case at the United Nations. The same view was also shared by Arcot Ramasamy Mudaliar. While chairing the Indian Committee on National Integration, C.P. introduced the clause making it mandatory that newly elected member of Parliament and state assemblies should take an allegiance to the Indian Union. It is believed that the introduction of this clause compelled the Dravida Munnetra Kazhagam to give up its goal of secession from the Indian Union.

C.P. was an active freemason and served as a member of the Carnatic Lodge.

Criticism 

While being hailed as a modernising reformer by many, C. P. is also criticised as a capitalist, authoritarian, imperialist, anti-Christian and anti-Communist by some. C. P. has been sharply criticized for failing to rescue the deteriorating Travancore National and Quilon Bank and for cracking down on the bank and its managing director, C. P. Mathen. It is believed that C.P., allegedly an anti-Christian framed the downfall of Quilon Bank, using his influence. In 1946, Communist dissent over C. P.'s policies erupted in the form of the Punnapra-Vayalar revolt which was crushed with a brutal hand by Travancore army and navy. Communist hatred over C. P.'s policies finally culminated in an assassination attempt upon the Diwan. However, despite deep antagonism between C. P. and Communists, he opposed the dismissal of the Communist government of Kerala headed by E. M. S. Namboodiripad in 1959 by the Jawaharlal Nehru government as "unconstitutional". C. P. was also labelled as a "secessionist" due to his initial reluctance in merging Travancore with the Indian Union. Jawaharlal Nehru said of his attitude towards imperialism:

His attempt to negotiate a trade agreement with Pakistan on behalf of Travancore was viewed as a betrayal by most Indians.

Family 

In 1895, at the age of 16, C. P. was married to nine-year-old Seethamma (1886–1930), granddaughter of Indian polyglot and judge C. V. Runganada Sastri. She died in March 1930 leaving behind three sons, C. R. Pattabhiraman, C. R. Venkata Subban and C. R. Sundaram. Pattabhiraman participated in the Indian Independence Movement and was active in the Indian National Congress even after C. P.'s resignation from the party. He was elected to the Lok Sabha from Kumbakonam in 1957 and 1962 and served as Deputy Minister and later, Minister of Industries from 1966 to 1967. Pattabhiraman was also one of the founders of the Madras Cricket Club along with P. Subbarayan. C.P.'s nephew would later go on to marry the niece and heiress to V.K. Krishna Menon.

In popular culture 

 Somerset Maugham named a character in his 1932 novel The Narrow Corner "Ramaswami Iyer" after C. P. Ramaswami Iyer, who he had met on a visit to India.
 Vaikom Muhammad Basheer wrote a collection of essays titled Dharmarajyam against the policies of C. P. Ramaswami Iyer. The book was banned and it is said that Basheer himself got these essays printed and sold them at local shops and households, going on foot. Basheer was arrested and jailed for two years later.
 Veteran Tamil film actor Nassar played the role of C. P. Ramasami Iyer in the 1998 Malayalam movie Rakthasakshikal Sindabad.

Works

Notes

References

Further reading

External links 

1879 births
1966 deaths
Administrators in the princely states of India
Presidency College, Chennai alumni
Indian dewans
Indian Hindus
Diwans of Travancore
Knights Commander of the Order of the Star of India
Knights Commander of the Order of the Indian Empire
Indian knights
People from British India
Indian National Congress politicians from Tamil Nadu
Vice Chancellors of Banaras Hindu University
Advocates General for Tamil Nadu
Academic staff of Annamalai University
University of Madras alumni
Indian Freemasons
Members of the Council of the Governor General of India